Star City Slayer (Stanley Dover) is a supervillain appearing in American comic books published by DC Comics. He is the grandfather of Stanley Dover who is named after him, though he is not named Stanley Dover Sr.

Brendan Fletcher portrayed a variation of the character in the seventh season of the Arrowverse television series Arrow.

Fictional character biography
In Star City, Stanley Dover Sr. was first seen walking down an alley where some hoodlums try to attack him only for him to be saved by Green Arrow who is back from the dead.

The Star City Slayer was seen feeding a vial of blood to a creature that is imprisoned in a glass cage underground. Stanley Dover later buys the Star City Youth Center and gains Mia Dearden as his first employee. He later explains to Mia that Oliver Queen "is missing time". Stanley felt that Oliver has missed the last 10 years of his life. This leads Stanley to outfit Oliver's home with outdated appliances and conveniences.

A soulless Oliver Queen later finds himself at Stanley Dover's house who knocks him unconscious and brings him down to the basement. Upon regaining conscious, Oliver finds out that Stanley Dover is the Star City Slayer as he gestures to an imprisoned blonde-haired kid dressed as a purple monster.

It was revealed that Dover Sr. had summoned the Beast in order to use it to grant him immortality using the Magdaline Grimoire that he gained from Jason Blood, but he had been roped into babysitting his grandson at the time he performed the ritual and the bond was transferred to the infant instead. Discovering the bond, the grandfather locked the younger Stanley in a large glass container and torments him, both physically and by forcing him to witness horrific acts of murder, all in an attempt to bring back the monster. Eventually abandoning his original plans to search for the monster while having Oliver Queen and Mia Deardon tied to the alters, Dover Sr. decides to transfer his soul into Green Arrow - currently resurrected by Hal Jordan as an amnesic body with no soul after the Final Night - with the goal of gaining access to the Watchtower monitoring systems to find the Beast, but Green Arrow was able to make contact with his soul in Heaven and convince the soul to return, allowing him and Connor Hawke's to fight through the demons that Dover Sr. had summoned until the monster Spot appeared to seal the door to Hell. He subsequently ate Dover Sr., later erasing the youngster's horrible memories of the act and of his imprisonment and torture to spare him from the tormented life he would otherwise endure. Stanley's will enabled Oliver Queen to get the Star City Youth Center.

Powers and abilities
The Star City Slayer is a master of the occult.

In other media
Stanley Dover appears in the seventh season of Arrow, portrayed by Brendan Fletcher. This version is a mentally unstable serial killer who has murdered several people inside and outside of prison and puts on a timid, weak facade. While imprisoned in Slabside Maximum Security Prison, Dover quickly befriends Oliver Queen, who frequently defends Dover from the other inmates. After discovering Dover's true personality and his framing of Ben Turner for the stabbing of a prison guard however, Queen abandons Dover, who breaks out amidst a riot incited by Ricardo Diaz. Dover eventually resurfaces to attack Queen's allies under the belief that they are bad influences on him before Queen eventually subdues Dover and the authorities return him to Slabside.

References

External links
 Star City Slayer at DC Wiki

Fictional cult leaders
DC Comics characters who use magic
DC Comics supervillains
Characters created by Kevin Smith
Characters created by Phil Hester
Fictional serial killers